The 2015–16 season was the 68th season of competitive football in Israel, and the 90th season under the Israeli Football Association, established in 1928, during the British Mandate.

The season saw Hapoel Be'er Sheva winning league, its first championship title since 1976 and Maccabi Haifa winning its first Israel State Cup in 18 years. In women's football, F.C. Ramat HaSharon won its first ever league title, the first since 2002 which was not won by either Maccabi Holon or ASA Tel Aviv University. F.C. Kiryat Gat won the Israeli Women's Cup, its first ever major title.

IFA Competitions

League Competitions

Men's senior competitions

Women's senior competitions

Youth competitions

Cup Competitions

International Club Competitions

Champions League

Second qualifying round

|}

Third qualifying round

|}

Play-off round

|}

Group stage (Group G)

Europa League

First qualifying round

|}

Second qualifying round

|}

Third qualifying round

|}

Women's Champions League

Qualifying round (Group 4)

2015–16 UEFA Youth League

Champions League Path group stage

National Teams

National team

Euro 2016 Qualifying (Group B)

2015–16 matches

Women's National Team

2017 Women's Euro qualification (group 8)

Aphrodite Cup, Cyprus

2015–16 matches

U-21 National team

2017 European U-21 qualifying round (Group 4)

2015–16 matches

U-19 National team

2016 UEFA European Under-19 Championship qualification

Qualifying round

Elite round

2015–16 matches

U-18 National team

Winter U-18 Tournament, Israel

2015–16 matches

U-19 Women's National team

2016 UEFA Women's Under-19 Championship qualification

Qualifying round (group 8)

2015–16 matches

 In addition to these matches, the national team competed in the Women's League, finishing 6th, with 11 victories, 2 draws and 9 losses, scoring 78 goals and conceding 28 goals.

U-17 National team

2016 UEFA European Under-17 Championship qualification

Qualifying round (group 11)

Elite round (group 8)

2015–16 matches

U-17 Women's National team

2015 European U-17 qualifying round (Group 7)

2015–16 results

U-16 National team

2015–16 matches

U-16 Women's National team

2015–16 results

References

 
Seasons in Israeli football